Rafael Rojas may refer to:
 Rafael Rojas (actor)
 Rafael Rojas (tenor)